Spohn may refer to:

People
Cassia Spohn, American criminologist
Daniel Spohn, American mixed martial artist
Friedrich August Wilhelm Spohn, German philologist
Herbert Spohn, German mathematician
Philip Howard Spohn, Canadian physician
Walter G. Spohn, American plastic surgeon
Wolfgang Spohn, German philosopher

Companies
Spohn Ranch, a skatepark company based in Industry, California

Geography
Mount Spohn, a mountain in Antarctica